The Leader River is a river in the Hurunui District of the Canterbury region in New Zealand's South Island.  It is a tributary of the Waiau River, which it meets near Parnassus.  Numerous smaller watercourses join the Leader River, including the Hookhamsnyvy Creek.

In the 1910s, the New Zealand Railways Department intended to build a railway up the Leader River's valley as part of the Main North Line linking Christchurch with the Marlborough region. However, the outbreak of World War I brought a halt to construction, and when work resumed on building the railway, a more easterly route out of Parnassus was chosen. Nonetheless, a pier from the never-completed Leader River bridge continues to stand in the river.

External links 
Photo of the Leader River railway bridge under construction.

References 

Rivers of Canterbury, New Zealand
Rivers of New Zealand